IL2P (Improved Layer 2 Protocol) is a data link layer protocol originally derived from layer 2 of the X.25 protocol suite and designed for use by amateur radio operators. It is used exclusively on amateur packet radio networks.

IL2P occupies the data link layer, the second layer of the OSI model. It is responsible for establishing link-layer connections, transferring data encapsulated in frames between nodes, and detecting errors introduced by the communications channel.

The Improved Layer 2 Protocol (IL2P) was created by Nino Carrillo, KK4HEJ, based on AX.25 version 2.0 and implements Reed Solomon Forward Error Correction for greater accuracy and throughput than either AX.25 or FX.25. Specifically, in order to achieve greater stability on link speeds greater than 1200 baud.

IL2P can be used with a variety of modulation methods including  AFSK and GFSK. The direwolf software TNC contains the first open source implementation of the protocol.

IL2P Specification 
The IL2P draft specification v0.5 was published via the Terrestrial Amateur Radio Packet Network (TARPN) on June 10, 2022.

As of version 0.5, the Weak-Signal-Extensions were added. This adds several features to the protocols. The automatic ID transmission for the FM/1200-baud and faster modes is still in place, but is not enabled if the lower speed SSB modes are selected.

Implementations 
IL2P was first implemented in the closed source and proprietary ninoTNC to solve for lossy network links due to low Signal-to-noise ratio or weak signal strength.

The specification itself outlines several design goals including:

 Forward error correction
 Eliminating bit-stuffing
 Streamlining the AX.25 header format
 Improved packet detection in the absence of Decode (DCD) and for open-squelch receive
 Produce a bitstream suitable for modulation on various physical layers
 Avoid bit-error-amplifying methods (differential encoding and free-running LFSRs)
 Increase efficiency and simplicity over FX.25 Forward Error Correction

See also 
NCpacket group

References 

Packet radio
Link protocols